Sonia Ingeborg Borg  (20 February 1931 – 4 February 2016) was an Austrian-Australian writer and producer,  one of the leading screenwriters of Australian films and TV in the 1960 and 70s. After extensive experience in theatre in Germany, India and South-East Asia she moved to Australia in 1961 and worked as a stage and television actress before becoming joining Crawford Productions in Melbourne. She wrote, produced and acted at Crawfords until the mid-1970s and worked on most of the company's dramas of the period in a range of roles. 

In the late 1970s she also became known for writing children's films, often about animals, such as Storm Boy and Blue Fin both based on books by Colin Thiele.

In 1985 Borg was awarded a Member of the Order of Australia  for her services to the film and television industry.

Select Writings
Homicide (1964–73; TV series)
Division 4 (1970–75; TV series)
Matlock Police (1971–75; TV series)
Rush (1974; TV series)
Power Without Glory (1976; mini series)
Solo One (1976; TV series)
Lasseter (1976; unmade film about Lasseters search
Storm Boy (1976)
Blue Fin (1978)
The Min Min (1978; unmade feature)
Women of the Sun (1981; TV series)
I Can Jump Puddles (1981; TV movies)
Dusty (1983)
Colour in the Creek (1985; TV series)
Dark Age (1987)
Ratbag Hero (1991; TV miniseries)

References

External links

Sonia Borg at National Film and Sound Archive
Obituary at Televisionau.com
Sonia Borg at AustLit

1931 births
2016 deaths
Australian women screenwriters
Members of the Order of Australia
Austrian emigrants to Australia
Writers from Vienna